Golden Axe is a series of beat-em-up video games.

Golden Axe may also refer to:
Golden Axe (video game), the first game in the series
"The Golden Axe", or "The Honest Woodcutter", one of Aesop's Fables